Prophetess is a 2021 Nigerian sports comedy film directed by Niyi Akinmolayan. The film stars Toyin Abraham, Kehinde Bankole, Uzor Arukwe, Stan Nze and Tina Mba in the lead roles. The film is based on a local prophetess who make bold bogus predictions about the outcome of a local club football match which goes beyond her control. The film had its theatrical release on 2 April 2021 and opened to positive reviews from critics. It also became a success at the box office.

Synopsis 
Ajoke (Toyin Abraham) is a prophetess in a small rural town who makes predictions about the future in exchange for money. One day she becomes an overnight sensation and popular among the Nigerians when she correctly predicted both the Arsenal's triumph at the UEFA Champions League as well as the winner of the Big Brother Naija television reality show during an Instagram live session with Dipo, an On-Air personality (OAP) and social media influencer. People start to believe her statements and even make huge bets on a local football club called Wonder Boyz soon after when Ajoke claimed that Wonder Boyz would defeat league table topper Gidi Boyz. The owner of the popular betting company Sure Banka, Eze-Ego (Uzor Arukwe) acknowledges the Ajoke's prediction and he attempts to involve in match-fixing in order to not let the Wonder Boyz win the match. With her life in danger, she elicits the help of her sister, Labake (Kehinde Bankole) who at the time is trying to cater for their mother's medical needs.

Cast 

 Toyin Abraham as Ajoke Olooto 
 Kehinde Bankole as Labake
 Stan Nze as Buntus
 Waliu Fagbemi as Akeem
 Deyemi Okanlawon as Fogo Bombastic
 Uzor Arukwe as Eze-Ego
 Adedimeji Lateef as Malaika
Kunle Remi as Dipo
 Ronke Ojo as Iya Ibeji
 Tina Mba as Shalewa
 Seyi Awolowo
 Blessing Jessica Obasi

Production and release 
Prophetess is the second collaboration between Niyi Akinmolayan and Toyin Abraham after Elevator Baby. The film was predominantly shot in Ibadan. It was set in Layole village in Oyo State. The director of the film Niyi Akinmolayan revealed that the veteran lead actress Toyin Abraham who played the titular lead role as the prophetess had once entered the spirit for nearly one hour during a rehearsal prior to a shooting sequence. It also delayed the rehearsal and crew members were made to await for over an hour.

Reception 
According to Sodas 'N' Popcorn, "the flaw with Prophetess is that much of the humour looks to be a product of the acting, and not the film. If the acting is great, the lines are far from it."

Jerry Chiemeke of Nigerian Entertainment Today said "Ultimately, Prophetess is a testament to Niyi Akinmolayan’s ambition and his dedication to improving himself. It is not a perfect film – it is 30 minutes too long – but it is his best one yet, and it shows how far he has come since Kajola. It’s a comedy, but it’s meaningful too, and unlike many of today’s films, it succeeds in delivering a coherent final act." It was also rated 6.8/10.

Awards and nominations

Box office 
The film collected over ₦43 million within just four days in the opening weekend despite the restricted seating capacity due to the COVID-19. The film grossed ₦108 million in the first four weeks after its release.

See also 
List of Nigerian films of 2021

References 

English-language Nigerian films
Films shot in Ibadan
2021 comedy films
Nigerian comedy films
Films directed by Niyi Akinmolayan
2020s English-language films